Huang Yishen (born 9 August 2001) is a Chinese footballer who plays as a forward for Serbian club Kabel.

Club career
Huang made his debut for Kabel in the 2021–22 season, playing three games as the club were relegated to the Serbian League.

Career statistics

Club

Notes

References

2001 births
Living people
Chinese footballers
Chinese expatriate footballers
Association football forwards
FK Kabel players
Serbian First League players
Chinese expatriate sportspeople in Serbia
Expatriate footballers in Serbia